Sigvard Gustav Emanuel "Sigge" Hultcrantz (22 May 1888 – 4 March 1955) was a Swedish sport shooter who competed in the 1920 Summer Olympics.

In 1920 he won the silver medal as member of the Swedish team in the team free pistol competition and in the team small-bore rifle event. He also participated in the individual free pistol competition and in the individual small-bore rifle event but for both contests his exact place is unknown.

At the time of the 1920 Olympics Hultcrantz was lieutenant in the Swedish coast artillery.  He eventually reached the rank of major, and was the commandant of Älvsborg fortress in 1936–1939.

References

External links
profile

1888 births
1955 deaths
Swedish male sport shooters
ISSF pistol shooters
ISSF rifle shooters
Olympic shooters of Sweden
Shooters at the 1920 Summer Olympics
Olympic silver medalists for Sweden
Olympic medalists in shooting
Medalists at the 1920 Summer Olympics
19th-century Swedish people
20th-century Swedish people